Trippin is a 2005 MTV environmental documentary television series hosted by Cameron Diaz. It also features many other celebrities, including Drew Barrymore, Redman, Jessica Alba, Eva Mendes, Mark Hoppus and Justin Timberlake. On the show, said celebrities visit various ecological locales around the world, in particular underprivileged areas of the world.

References

External links
 

MTV original programming
2000s American reality television series
Environmental television
2005 American television series debuts
2005 American television series endings